The Shun dynasty, officially the Great Shun, also known as Li Shun, was a short-lived Chinese dynasty that existed during the Ming–Qing transition. The dynasty was founded in Xi'an on 8 February 1644, the first day of the lunar year, by Li Zicheng, the leader of a large peasant rebellion, by proclaiming himself "emperor" instead of the title "king" before founding the dynasty.

The capture of Beijing by the Shun forces in April 1644 marked the end of the Ming dynasty, but Li Zicheng failed to solidify his political and military control, and in late May 1644 he was defeated at the Battle of Shanhai Pass by the joint forces of Ming general Wu Sangui who shifted his alliance to the Qing dynasty after the fall of the Ming dynasty, with Manchu prince Dorgon. When he fled back to Beijing in early June, Li finally proclaimed himself the Yongchang Emperor of the Great Shun and left the capital the next day after setting the palace ablaze and ransacking the government offices. He may have intended to resume his Imperial claims later on by proclaiming his accession in the Forbidden City. After the death of the emperor, Shun remnants joined with the Southern Ming in Nanjing, while continuing to refer to Li as their "deceased emperor". The Shun dynasty weakened dramatically after the death of Li Zicheng in 1645. The successors, his brother Li Zijing and nephew Li Guo, could not fight back and the dynasty ended in 1649 when Li Guo died in Nanning, Guangxi.

After the Shun was created, Li Zicheng ordered the soldiers to kill the Ming remnants still existing in Beijing, resulting in strong rebellions from the forces of the Southern Ming. With the Shun ministers constantly fighting for power, the dynasty effectively lasted less than a year.

Monarchs

Generals and ministers 
Niu Jinxing (牛金星), chancellor
Gu Jun'en (顧君恩), staff
Li Yan (李岩), staff
Song Xiance (宋獻策), staff
Liu Zongmin (劉宗敏), general
Yuan Zongdi (袁宗第)
Tian Jianxiu (田見秀)
Hao Yaoqi (郝搖旗), general
Li Guo (李過), general and nephew of Li Zicheng
Li Zijing (李自敬), general and younger brother of Li Zicheng, inherited the throne after the death of Li Zicheng
Gao Jie (高傑), general
Lady Gao Guiying (高桂英), Li Zicheng's wife and general

References

Further reading 
Wakeman Frederic (1981). "The Shun Interregnum of 1644", in Jonathan Spence, et al. eds. From Ming to Ch’ing: Conquest, Region, and Continuity in Seventeenth-Century China. Yale University Press.
Huang Weiping (黃衛平) (2010). "Draft history of Da Shun (大順史稿)"

 
Dynasties in Chinese history
Former countries in Chinese history
1640s in China
States and territories established in 1644
States and territories disestablished in 1645
1644 establishments in China
1645 disestablishments in China
Qing dynasty